The Statue of Lázaro Cárdenas is an instance of public art in Madrid, Spain.

History and description 
A homage to Lázaro Cárdenas, the Mexican President who welcomed about 30,000 Spanish Republican exiles fleeing the Spanish Civil War and the ensuing Francoist dictatorship, was one of the first decisions taken by the democratic municipal corporation formed after the 1979 Madrid municipal election, passed in the first meeting session of the plenary of the Ayuntamiento. Costs of the structure were funded by the Ayuntamiento, while the statue was financed via popular subscription among the Spanish Republican community in Mexico. Initially intending to erect a bust, they reportedly collected so much money a full-body statue was commissioned.

The design of the project was awarded to Mexican sculptor Julián Martínez, himself a Spanish exile who arrived to Mexico when he was young. Cast in bronze in Mexico, the costs for the transportation of the monument to Madrid were also funded by the Spanish Republican community in Mexico. Joaquín Roldán and Santiago Cubero had a role in the erection of the monument as architects.

The monument was unveiled on 16 November 1983 during a ceremony attended by Enrique Tierno Galván (Mayor of Madrid),  (Head of Mexico City), Amalia Solórzano (widow of Cárdenas), Cuauhtémoc Cárdenas (son of Cárdenas), Enrique Barón, Joaquín Leguina and José Federico de Carvajal, among others.

Following an initiative of the Association of Descendants of the Spanish Exile, a new plaque reading  ("father of the Spaniards without homeland and without rights, persecuted by tyranny and disinherited by hate"), a quote dedicated to Cárdenas by Álvaro de Albornoz upon the latter's arrival to Mexico as exile, was unveiled in October 2005.

See also 
 Statue of Lázaro Cárdenas (Puerto Vallarta)

References 
Citations

Bibliography
 

Bronze sculptures in Spain
Outdoor sculptures in Madrid
Sculptures of men in Spain
Statues of presidents of Mexico
Buildings and structures in Fuencarral-El Pardo District, Madrid
Monuments and memorials in Madrid